Stephen Carroll Cookson (born June 6, 1958)  is an American educator, farmer and politician.

Prior to being elected to the Missouri House of Representatives, Cookson worked in education for three decades. He served as a coach, teacher, principal and superintendent before his retirement in 2010. Cookson was elected to the Missouri House of Representatives in November 2010, serving the citizens of District 153.

Cookson is running for the Missouri Senate in the 2020 general election for Missouri's 25th Senate District.

Early life, education, and career 
Steve Cookson was born on June 26, 1958 in Dallas, Texas. After spending the first year of his life in Dallas, the Cookson family moved to Puxico, Missouri. He was born into a family of educators, and his family relocated often in his early years. Steve’s father, legendary basketball coach Carroll Cookson, moved to Advance, Missouri in 1966. Steve had a front row seat as his father gradually built one of the most storied high school basketball programs in the State of Missouri.

Upon graduation with honors from Advance High School in 1976, Steve enrolled in Three Rivers College in Poplar Bluff, Missouri. During his time there, Steve played on the basketball squad for legendary Coach Gene Bess.

After graduating from Three Rivers in 1978, Steve furthered his education at College of the Ozarks in Point Lookout, Missouri. He graduated in 1980 with dual degrees in Physical Education and Biology.

Steve started his career in 1981 teaching junior high in the Southwest R-5 School District in Washburn, Missouri. Steve taught a variety of subjects throughout his career, and also served as a basketball coach. He was named superintendent of the Naylor R-11 School District in 2001, and finished his career out with retirement in May 2010.

Missouri House of Representatives

Elections 
On November 2, 2010, Cookson was elected to represent the citizens of District 153 in the Missouri House of Representatives. District 153 consists of areas in Butler, Ripley, Carter and Wayne counties. He was sworn-in on January 5, 2011. Cookson served on various committees throughout the 2011-2018 legislative sessions. In part to his lengthy background in education, he was appointed as Chair of both the Elementary and Secondary Education Committee, as well as the Higher Education Committee.

2010
On November 2, 2010, Cookson won election to the Missouri House of Representatives. Cookson's opponent in the August 3 primary was Chris Johnston.

2012
Cookson won re-election in the 2012 election for Missouri House of Representatives, District 153. Cookson ran unopposed in the August 7 Republican primary and ran unopposed in the general election, which took place on November 6, 2012.

2014

Elections for the Missouri House of Representatives took place in 2014. A primary election was held on August 5, 2014, and a general election on November 4, 2014. The signature filing deadline for candidates wishing to run in this election was March 25, 2014. Incumbent Steve Cookson was unopposed in the Republican primary. Ginny Keirns was unopposed in the Libertarian primary. Cookson faced Keirns in the general election. Incumbent Cookson defeated Keirns in the general election.

2016
Elections for the Missouri House of Representatives took place in 2016. The primary election was held on August 2, 2016, and the general election was held on November 8, 2016. The candidate filing deadline was March 29, 2016. Incumbent Steve Cookson defeated Matt Michel in the Missouri House of Representatives District 153 general election.

Committee assignments
 Agriculture Policy
 Appropriations - Public Safety and Corrections
 Children and Families
 Education
 Elementary and Secondary Education, Chair
 Higher Education, Chair
 Joint Committee on Corrections, Vice Chair
 Joint Committee on Education
 Tourism and Natural Resources
 Trade and Tourism

Electoral history

References

External links 
 Steve Cookson for State Senate
 Rep. Steve Cookson - Ballotpedia
 Representative Steve Cookson

|-

1958 births
Living people
Politicians from Dallas
American Christians
American educators
Southeast Missouri State University alumni
College of the Ozarks alumni
Three Rivers College (Missouri)
Republican Party members of the Missouri House of Representatives
People from Stoddard County, Missouri